Ronald Craig Arkin (born 1949) is an American roboticist and roboethicist, and a Regents' Professor in the School of Interactive Computing, College of Computing at the Georgia Institute of Technology. He is known for the motor schema technique in robot navigation and for his book Behavior-Based Robotics.

Biography

Education
Ronald Arkin received a B.S. from the University of Michigan, Ann Arbor in 1971 and an M.S. from the Stevens Institute of Technology in 1977. He was a faculty member of Hawthorne College in Antrim, New Hampshire from 1977 to 1989, serving as the Computer Science Depart Chair from 1986 to 1989. In 1985, he joined the Laboratory for Perceptual Robotics and VISIONS groups at the University of Massachusetts Amherst, and received a Ph.D. in 1987. His doctoral thesis Towards Cosmopolitan Robots: Intelligent Navigation in Extended Man-Made Environments was supervised by Edward M. Riseman.

Career
Shortly after receiving his Ph.D., Ronald Arkin joined the School of Information and Computer Science (now College of Computing) at the Georgia Institute of Technology and founded the Mobile Robot Laboratory. He became a Regents' Professor in 2002 and was the first person to hold such honor in the College of Computing's history. From August, 1997 to August, 1998, Arkin was a STINT Visiting Professor at the Centre for Autonomous Systems, Royal Institute of Technology, Stockholm, Sweden. He served as the Sabbatical Chair for the Sony Intelligence Dynamics Laboratory, Tokyo, Japan, from June, 2005 to October, 2005, and was also a member of the Laboratory for analysis and architecture of systems at the Centre National de la Recherche Scientifique, Toulouse, France.

In 2006, the United States Department of Defense contracted Arkin to conduct a study to determine if military robots could be made to operate ethically. The goal is to create a robot with an "artificial conscience" such that, for example, it might refrain from firing weaponry when children were detected, or to even understand the laws of war and apply them in battle. “My intention in designing this is that robots will make less mistakes—hopefully far less mistakes—than humans do in the battlefield,” Arkin says.

Research 
 Mobile robots and unmanned aerial vehicles
 Behavior-based reactive control
 Action-oriented perception
 Hybrid deliberative/reactive software architectures
 Robot survivability
 Multiagent robotic systems
 Biorobotics
 Human-robot interaction
 Roboethics
 Learning in autonomous systems.

Students 
 Robin Murphy (Summer, 1992). Thesis: An Architecture for Intelligent Sensor Fusion. Founder of rescue robot and currently a professor at the Texas A&M University, College Station, TX.
 Erika Rogers (Fall, 1992). Thesis: Visual Interaction: A Link Between Perception and Problem-Solving. Currently a professor at the California Polytechnic University, San Luis Obispo, California.
 Douglas MacKenzie (Spring 1997). Thesis: A Design Methodology for the Configuration of Behavior-based Mobile Robots. President and Founder of Mobile Intelligence Co.
 Tucker Balch (Fall, 1998). Thesis: Behavioral Diversity in Learning Robot Teams. Currently an associate professor at the College of Computing, Georgia Institute of Technology.
 Khaled Ali (Spring, 1999). Thesis: Multiagent Robotics: Relating Systems to Tasks.  Currently a Research Scientist at the Jet Propulsion Laboratory.
 Alexander Stoytchev (Summer, 2007). Thesis: Robot Tool Behavior: A Developmental Approach to Autonomous Tool Use. Currently an assistant professor at the Iowa State University, Ames, Iowa.
 Eric Martinson (Fall 2007). Thesis: Acoustical Awareness for Intelligent Robotic Action.
 Alan Wagner (Fall 2010). Thesis: The Role of Trust and Relationships in Human-Robot Social Interaction. Currently an associate professor at The Pennsylvania State University and a research associate with the Rock Ethics Institute.
 Zsolt Kira (Spring 2010). Thesis: Communication and Alignment of Grounded Symbolic Knowledge Among Heterogeneous Robots. Currently a Research Scientist II at Georgia Tech Research Institute working in the ATAS Lab

Books

Papers

References

External links 
 Home Page
 Mathematics Genealogy Project profile
 Mobile Robot Laboratory

1949 births
Artificial intelligence researchers
Control theorists
Living people
Georgia Tech faculty
American roboticists
University of Michigan alumni